is a Shinto shrine in Chūō-ku, Kobe, Japan, roughly on the site of the Battle of Minatogawa established in 1872.

The enshrined kami is the spirit of Masashige Kusunoki, a military commander. It is one of the Fifteen Shrines of the Kenmu Restoration.

References

External links
Minatogawa Shrine Homepage (Japanese)

Buildings and structures in Kobe
Shinto shrines in Hyōgo Prefecture
Tourist attractions in Kobe
Historic Sites of Japan
Beppyo shrines